APA Group (Apa Gurūpu, commonly known as APA, Always Pleasant Amenities) is a Japanese hospitality group that operates APA Hotels. APA Hotels operates  in Japan with more than 300 properties. APA recently expanded into the United States in 2015. On November 13, 2015, APA opened the APA Hotel Woodbridge (formerly a Hilton) in Iselin, New Jersey. APA acquired the Vancouver-based Coast Hotels in 2016. There are plans to open more hotels in the United States in the future.

Controversy

APA Group distributes political propaganda written by its president, Toshio Motoya, a strong supporter of revisionist historical views aligned with those of Japan's far-right. For example, in a series of interviews published online from APA Group's magazine Apple Town, Motoya referred to Japanese aggression, the Nanking Massacre, and the sex slavery of comfort women as "fabricated stories created to dishonor Japan" he claimed that having spoken to many important figures in the 81 countries he has visited and to many ambassadors to Japan that "not a single person believes in things such as the Nanking Massacre or comfort women story..." Such views are known to create negative feelings in neighboring countries such as China and Korea. These publications are widely distributed in APA Hotels. In addition, Motoya disclosed in his books that he plans to give maximum support to the Abe administration to rebuke China and Korea on these historical issues. Some Chinese tourist organizations are boycotting the chain.

The Chinese foreign ministry spokeswoman Hua Chunying stated that the China National Tourism Administration has requested to all Chinese companies and websites to not conduct business with APA, and for people to not go to their hotels, she said "China is willing to have friendly interactions with Japan, but will never tolerate flagrant provocations distorting the history and offending the Chinese people."

Safety issues
In 2007, several APA hotels were discovered to have faked their earthquake safety data with some buildings having only 70 percent of the legally required structural strength.  This greatly reduced construction costs but put customers at risk as Japan is amongst the world's most earthquake prone countries.

References

External links
 APA Hotels (official website)
 M. Schreiber, Defiant Apa paints a target on its back, The Japan Times (February 11, 2017)
 M. Penn, APA Hotel Amenities Not Always Pleasant, Shingetsu News Agency (Nov. 24, 2021)

Hotel chains in Japan